Sclarene is a diterpene present in the foliage of Podocarpus hallii.

References

Diterpenes
Decalins
Polyenes
Vinylidene compounds